Alexei Viktorovich Ishmametyev (born June 17, 1988) is a Russian professional ice hockey defenceman. He currently plays for Yertis Pavlodar of the Kazakhstan Hockey Championship.

External links

Living people
1988 births
Barys Nur-Sultan players
Dizel Penza players
HC MVD players
Nomad Astana players
Metallurg Magnitogorsk players
Molot-Prikamye Perm players
Neftyanik Almetyevsk players
People from Magnitogorsk
Stalnye Lisy players
Yermak Angarsk players
Yertis Pavlodar players
Yuzhny Ural Orsk players
Universiade medalists in ice hockey
Universiade silver medalists for Kazakhstan
Competitors at the 2015 Winter Universiade
Russian ice hockey defencemen
Sportspeople from Chelyabinsk Oblast